John Pugh (born 1948) is a British politician.

John or Johnny Pugh may also refer to:

John Pugh (of Mathafarn) (c. 1675–1737), Member of Parliament for Montgomery and Cardiganshire
John Pugh (Canadian politician) (1821–1900), merchant and politician in Nova Scotia, Canada
John Pugh (Pennsylvania politician) (1761–1842), U.S. congressman from Pennsylvania
John H. Pugh (1827–1905), American physician, member of the U.S. House of Representatives from New Jersey 
John Pugh (artist) (born 1957), known for creating trompe-l'oeil public murals
John Pugh (RAF officer) (1890–1966), Canadian World War I flying ace
John Pugh (cricketer) (1904–1964), who played for Warwickshire
John Pugh (priest) (1885–1961), Archdeacon of Carmarthen
John Pugh (musician), former member of !!!
Johnny Pugh, American baseball player